There are ten Interstate Highways in New Jersey, including four primary routes and six auxiliary routes.

See also

References

External links

New Jersey Department of Transportation
Unofficial New Jersey route log

Interstate